Very Intense Tropical Cyclone Freddy was an exceptionally long-lived, powerful, and deadly storm that traversed the southern Indian Ocean for more than five weeks in February and March 2023. Freddy is both the longest-lasting and highest-ACE-producing tropical cyclone ever recorded worldwide. It was the fourth named storm of the 2022–23 Australian region cyclone season, and the second very intense tropical cyclone of the 2022–23 South-West Indian Ocean cyclone season.

Freddy first developed as a disturbance embedded within the monsoon trough on 4 February 2023. While in the Australian region cyclone basin, the storm quickly intensified and became a Category 4 severe tropical cyclone, before it moved into the South-West Indian Ocean basin, where it intensified further. Freddy made its first landfall near Mananjary, Madagascar. The storm rapidly weakened overland but re-strengthened in the Mozambique Channel. Shortly afterward, Freddy made second landfall just south of Vilankulos, Mozambique, before rapidly weakening. Unexpectedly, the system managed to survive its visit in Mozambique and emerged back over the channel on 1 March. Soon after, Freddy was re-classified as a tropical cyclone by the MFR. Over the course of 10 days, Freddy rapidly intensified on two occasions, eventually slowing to a semi-stationary movement near Quelimane, Mozambique. Moving northwest inland, the storm gradually deteriorated and dissipated over Mozambique on 15 March.

Preparations for the storm in the Mascarene Islands included flight groundings, cyclone alerts, and personnel being prepped for the aftermath, among other things. In Madagascar, areas previously affected by Cyclones Batsirai and Cheneso were feared to be worsened by the storm's arrival. On 20–21 February, Freddy skirted Mauritius and Réunion to the north, bringing strong winds and adverse weather conditions. A Taiwanese-flagged vessel with a crew of 16 went missing northeast of Mauritius. The cyclone struck southeastern Madagascar, damaging many homes. Impacts in Mozambique were more severe than in Madagascar and included heavy rainfall in the southern half of the country, and widely damaged infrastructure. Effects in Mozambique were exacerbated after its second landfall with further floods and wind damage.

Hardest-hit was Malawi where incessant rains caused catastrophic flash floods, with Blantyre suffering the brunt of it. The nation's power grid was crippled, with its hydroelectric dam rendered inoperable. Overall, the cyclone killed at least 582 people: 476 in Malawi, 86 in Mozambique, 17 in Madagascar, two in Zimbabwe, and one in Mauritius. The widespread and prolonged impacts prompted extensive relief efforts from the affected nations and multiple intergovernmental agencies. UNICEF and the WFP provided relief items for those affected, as well as temporary shelters. Food security was of particular concern, with millions of others left at risk. The storm struck during a widespread cholera outbreak in Mozambique and Malawi as well; severe flooding worsened the epidemic. Survivors of the cyclone were found desperately digging in rubble with their bare hands in hopes that they would find other survivors. Numerous deceased people were found every day as the aftermath lingered around the affected areas.

Meteorological history

On 30 January, the Australian Bureau of Meteorology (BoM) monitored a developing tropical low in the Timor Sea. The BoM designated Tropical Low 13U on 4 February, and later that day upgraded it to a Category 1 tropical cyclone, naming it Freddy. On the same day, the Joint Typhoon Warning Center (JTWC) classified the system as Tropical Cyclone 11S. The BoM subsequently upgraded Freddy into a Category 2 tropical cyclone. Freddy attained Category 3 cyclone. The cyclone began showing an eye feature visible in microwave imaging. Freddy weakened slightly due to CDO and a persistent area of cold cloud tops. Freddy had further intensified to a Category 4 severe tropical cyclone due to the presence of a well-defined eye surrounded by deep convection. Freddy gradually became disorganized, with its eye no longer well-defined. During 14 February, Freddy crossed 90° E into the South-West Indian Ocean basin and was immediately classified as a tropical cyclone by Météo-France (MFR).

Later the next day, Freddy was upgraded to a very intense tropical cyclone. At about 7 p.m. local time on 21 February, the cyclone made its first landfall near Mananjary, Madagascar. During 22 February, Freddy significantly improved in organization as it moved southwestward across the Mozambique Channel. Freddy re-strengthened into a moderate tropical storm after the convection began to rapidly increase. Freddy re-strengthened further, marking its intensification into a severe tropical storm. Freddy continued to organize with convective bands wrapping into the center. Freddy rapidly weakened as it moved westward and further inland, weakening to an overland depression by 18:00 UTC that day. Even though the MFR stopped issuing advisories on 25 February, they were still monitoring and predicted that the remnant low would likely re-develop into a tropical system. Freddy re-emerged over the Mozambique Channel, the MFR resumed advisories on the system as tropical disturbance on 2 March.

Throughout the next day, Freddy was downgraded to zone of disturbed weather status. An ASCAT-C pass showed winds below gale-force in its southern quadrant, prompting MFR to classify the storm as a moderate tropical storm. Freddy strengthened to a severe tropical storm as it approached the coast of Madagascar. Satellite imagery showed that an ill-defined eye was visible, and Freddy intensified further into a tropical cyclone. Freddy rapidly weakened as a result of the presence of higher wind shear as well as dry air intrusion. The JTWC and MFR indicated that Freddy strengthened into . The system gradually degraded and MFR ceased monitoring it as a tropical cyclone on 13 March. During 15 March, the MFR reported that Freddy's remnants had finally dissipated.

Preparations

Mauritius
A class I cyclone warning was issued by Mauritius for Rodrigues, and later a class II cyclone warning was issued. Flights from Rodrigues to Saint-Denis, Réunion, were canceled or rescheduled due to inclement weather. Prime Minister Pravind Jugnauth stated this during a radio and television address urging vigilance and caution. The country also shut down its stock exchange as the storm neared. A total of 1,019 people sought refuge in public shelters.

Réunion

On 18 February, A cyclone yellow pre-alert was issued for the island of Réunion by the MFR. The following day, this was upgraded to an orange alert which prompted all schools to close. Hospital patients whose conditions did not require immediate treatment were to return home while those with more care-intensive needs were to be transported to designated facilities. The island's power company, EDF La Réunion, prepped 200 personnel with a further 100 people from subcontracted companies for immediate repairs once storm conditions subsided. Call centers were staffed with 60 additional workers. The company also prepped 50 vehicles, electrical equipment, 15 generators, and 4 helicopters for use. Residents in areas hard-hit by Cyclone Batsirai in February 2022 worried of exacerbated damage upon Freddy's arrival. Authorities in Le Tampon were mobilizing for the system's arrival.

High seas prompted the closure of the Nouvelle route du Littoral with bus shuttles established to transport residents through inland routes to and from communities in the north and west. On 20 February, the RSMA-R mobilized 250 personnel for relief efforts. All service at Roland Garros Airport was suspended the same day, with service to resume following the cyclone's passage. A red alert for coastal flooding was issued for areas between Champs Borne and Pointe des Cascades. The city of Saint-Benoît opened two public shelters and closed all sporting facilities. Officials in Saint-Pierre postponed a local carnival for more than two weeks.

Madagascar

Cyclone Freddy threatened areas of Madagascar still reeling from the successive impacts of Cyclones Batsirai and Emnati in 2022; 874,000 people remained food insecure in the region. Medair noted that the region was suffering from a surge in childhood malnutrition stemming from an inadequate humanitarian response to the aforementioned cyclones. On 18 February, General Directorate of Meteorology issued warnings for the Analanjirofo and Sava regions, advising residents to take precautions as the cyclone was expected to make landfall. In the landfall area, Madagascar's weather service noted "torrential rains" and "very high to enormous seas" were of concern. The government of Madagascar pre-positioned  of rice to areas threatened by Freddy. Transportation services and schools were closed on 21 February. Residents at risk of Freddy placed sandbags over their homes' roofs for reinforcement.

The International Federation of Red Cross and Red Crescent Societies (IFRC) in Madagascar announced it was preparing for the cyclone. The Global Disaster Alert and Coordination System estimated over 2.2 million people would be affected by Freddy's storm surge and flooding in the country. Tents, ropes, chainsaws, and other supplies have been sent by the National Office for Risk and Disaster Management (BNGRC) to the eastern districts. The United Nations Office for the Coordination of Humanitarian Affairs (OCHA) and its partners deployed 80 humanitarian staff to Mahanoro, Mananjary, and Manakara, and placed two aircraft on standby. The agency was unable to sufficiently allocate emergency supplies due to a lack of funding and shortages from Cyclone Cheneso the month prior. Medair already had field offices in place after Cyclone Cheneso in southern and southeastern Madagascar. Emphasis was placed on providing clean drinking water and emergency kits to residents in Marondava and Maroansetra. At least 7,000 people were pre-emptively evacuated from at-risk coastal regions before Freddy's arrival.

Mozambique

First arrival 
Local reports had estimated over 600,000 people were expected to be affected in the country by the cyclone alone. Overall, a month's worth of rain was forecasted. The country's national meteorological service issued a red alert on 21 February. Freddy's intense and prolonged rainfall was also feared to worsen flooding in central and northern areas, affecting up to 1.75 million people, this rainfall also caused deadly landslides. Rescue teams, food supplies, tents, and boats were put in place to support the aftermath.

Second arrival 
According to the National Institute for Disaster Risk Management and Reduction (INGD), approximately 565,000 people were at risk, though a United Nations and European Union-led disaster alert predicted 2.3 million were at risk. Thousands were moved to evacuation shelters as precaution.

Malawi
Cyclone Freddy was expected to hit Malawi, and bring with it torrential rains and damaging winds to the southern region. Forecasts predicted accumulations of rainfall there could reach . The Ministry of Education  ordered the suspension of all classes in districts at risk.

Impact
In general, Freddy produced extraordinarily heavy rains, primarily in Mozambique and Malawi. Heavy winds lashed areas as well, and infrastructure took heavy hits due to excessive flooding. Freddy's stalling over Mozambique and Malawi worsened the rains immensely.

Mauritius

According to the MMS, the cyclone passed within  of the island, just north of Grand Bay. Strong winds and waves were observed along the northern coast of Mauritius. Flooding and gale-force winds also affected the country. 

Around 4:00 a.m. local time on 20 February, contact was lost with the Taiwanese-flagged fishing trawler LV Lien Sheng Fa with a crew of 16 just outside the territorial waters of Mauritius. The crew included a Taiwanese captain and 15 Indonesian fishermen. An alert was sent out by Taiwan's Fisheries Agency for the missing vessel on 23 February. Later sorties by the aircraft Dornier and the ship  CGA Baracuda failed to find any survivors. Mauritius deployed a diving team to confirm the identity of the ship. The vessel's lifeboat was confirmed to have been deployed; however, it has not been found as of 3 March.

Réunion
Freddy impacted Réunion on 20–21 February, with its effects being relatively limited. Nearly 25,000 customers were left without power at the height of the cyclone; all but 500 had their service restored within a day. In Saint-Paul, 20 tons of mangoes were destroyed. Highway RD48 in Salazie was closed due to a landslide. Eleven mobile sites maintained by Orange S.A. were knocked offline in Tampon, Saint-Louis, and Saint-Paul. On 23 February, Foehn winds on the backside of the storm led to temperatures reaching  along the southwestern coast of Réunion.

Madagascar

Damage was less than expected due to Freddy's weaker than forecasted winds, and early preparations. Freddy made its first landfall near Mananjary, which was still recovering from Cyclone Batsirai a year earlier. In total, over 14,000 homes were affected, with 5,500 destroyed, 3,079 flooded, and at least 9,696 damaged. At least 24,358 people were displaced, with over 12,000 in Mananjary alone. 

Freddy also left 79 schools roofless, damaged 37 more, and destroyed six. The storm's effects caused more than 11,000 to flee their homes. The impact zone of Freddy included 13-15 municipalities.About  of land was flooded according to UNOSAT. Overall, the cyclone was responsible for 17 deaths and affected 299,000 people.

Mozambique
Exact figures for amounts killed per landfall vary by source, but in all, Freddy left 86 dead and 510,000 were affected in the country.

First landfall
Cyclone Freddy made its first landfall in Mozambique (and second landfall overall) south of Vilanculos, Inhambane Province, causing heavy rains, strong winds, and rough seas. Some damage was reported, primarily due to fallen trees and rooftops. Public infrastructure and services have also suffered widespread damage, including 60 health units, 1,012 schools. At least ten people died in the country during the first landfall. Over 166,600 were affected. Much of the southern half of the country saw rainfall totaling 200 mm to 500 mm (7.87 in to 19.68 in). Thousands of homes were damaged, with approximately 28,300 destroyed. 1,265 km (786.03 mi) of road across many were damaged. More than 92,000 hectares of crops were affected, and more than 18,700 hectares of crops were lost in areas where 400,000 were food insecure. The storm struck during a cholera outbreak, raising worries of the storm worsening its effects.

Second landfall
Freddy made its second landfall in Zambezia Province on 11 March, bringing torrential rainfall, storm surge, and much stronger winds compared to the prior landfall. The Zambezi and Tambarara river basins had reported above-average water levels before its landfall. The power utility had turned off the electricity completely as a precaution against the cyclone. Locals reported seeing roofs torn off houses, broken windows, and streets flooded in Quelimane. All flights were suspended due to the inclement weather brought by Freddy. 

Communications and electrical supplies were cut early into the storm, hampering damage assessments. Power company Electricidade de Moçambique said that most areas had electricity restored by 11 March mid-afternoon. The nation's UNICEF chief of advocacy, communications, and partnerships, Guy Taylor, stated that there was "lots of destruction", and that Freddy was "potentially a disaster of large magnitude".  Taylor also noted that rural areas were completely destroyed. Access to clean water was effectively cut off in Quelimane. 

State TV reported that hundreds were displaced in Freddy's wake. More than 650 houses in Marromeu district, and over 3,000 in Sofala province were affected by flooding. The nation saw a year's worth of rainfall in just 4 weeks. Locals said localized flooding was an issue even before landfall. Widespread areas received over 500-1000 mm (19.68-39.37 in) of rainfall, with smaller, localized pockets of 1000-1500 mm (39.37-59.05 in), eclipsing the maximum accumulations of Cyclone Idai 4 years earlier. 191,562 hectares of cropland were damaged, and over 800,000 people were living in flooded areas following Freddy. Cholera cases also increased among affected populations. A total of 8 provinces were damaged by the cyclone. 

The old provincial hospital in Quelimane had its roof blown off, making supporting those in need more difficult. Many people were left homeless during the storm and took shelter in schools, the latter being turned into reception areas. Large amounts of crop fields were flooded as well. The INGD stated that the storm's effects on Mozambique were worse than expected. Freddy affected areas were initially deemed safe beforehand. Overall, Freddy caused at least 53 deaths on its second arrival. At least 96,200 people were affected as well. An estimated 49,000 were displaced and another 280 were injured.

Malawi 
Before Freddy arrived in Malawi, the country had been experiencing its worst cholera outbreak in history. Freddy's effects increased fears among the public that it would worsen. Rainfall was heaviest in the southern region of the country. These districts include Blantyre, Phalombe, Mulanje, Chikhwawa, and Nsanje. Flash floods devastated many regions, washing away homes and people and leaving infrastructure ruined. The entire nation experienced blackout due to EGENCO shutting down power to avoid further damage to power-generating machines. The nation's hydroelectric power plant was rendered inoperable by debris. In terms of rainfall, over a month's worth of rain was dumped in just a day. 

At least 476 people were killed in the onslaught of Freddy with 349 others missing, and 918 injuries reported. At least 192 of these deaths were reported in Blantyre, and at least 40 of whom were children according to Médecins Sans Frontières. 135 of them were in Mulanje as well. 180,000 people were displaced across the country and forced to evacuate their homes, with 500,000 affected in general. Among these 280,000 were children. There were also around 90 fatalities in Mulanje. More than 50,000 houses were damaged or destroyed. In terms of rainfall, over a month's worth of rain was dumped in just a day, totaling to six months of precipitation in six days. The small village of Mtauchira in Chiradzulu District was completely destroyed by a landslide that fell from Chambe Peak. At least 7 people died and 40 were injured in the village while an unknown number of others were missing as of 14 March. 

Over 430 km2 (166.02 sq mi) of general land was flooded, causing many smallholder farmers to have their crops and fields lost to the storm. Approximately 75,000 hectares of cropland were inundated. The storm struck just as farmers were about to harvest, compounding to local food insecurities in the nation. Notable rainfall recordings include a record-setting 458 mm (18.03 in) in 24 hours in Phalombe District. Several other districts also reported 300 mm (11.81 in) in the same time range. Houses whose foundations were weakened by the system also collapsed in Mangochi District.

Dozens of houses were reported being washed away in floodwaters in Chilobwe. Schools in ten southern regions were ordered to be closed until 15 March. Heavy rains also were reported in Salima and Lilongwe. Malawian president Lazarus Chakwera declared a state of disaster in the southern regions. Victims were thought to be buried under rubble and debris. During Freddy's extended stay in the country, visibility remained at near-zero levels. Several roads and bridges were cut, and many areas were cut off. Landslides across Chiradzulu Mountain blocked roadways, leaving Chiradzulu Boma inaccessible. Chakwera also stated that 13 districts suffered impacts from Freddy, equating to over half the country. He also said that 36 roads were broken, nine bridges washed away, and there were still many villages inaccessible by 20 March.

Zimbabwe
Heavy rainfall extending from Freddy impacted eastern Zimbabwe for a prolonged period as it meandered over Mozambique and the Mozambique Channel. At the end of February as the storm moved over Mozambique, heavy rains and strong winds impacted the nation. Five homes and two schools had their roofs torn off in Mashonaland Central Province. One person was killed in Shamva on 26 February when the tree they were sheltering from the rain under collapsed. A second person was killed by unspecified causes. In Masvingo Province, one home was destroyed by rainfall and another was struck by lightning. Manicaland Province in particular was heavily affected with continuous rainfall from 12–14 March. Crops were adversely affected in the Chipinge and Chiredzi districts.

Elsewhere 
Rainfall of at least  occurred across regions of South Africa and Eswatini. Heavy rainfall also occurred in Zambia.

Aftermath 
Due to the storm striking during a historic cholera outbreak, water purification supplies were in critical need, and in short supply.

Madagascar 

64 tons of food relief rations were made available following Freddy's passing. Several shelter sites were opened, with many being vacated within a day of the storm. The World Food Programme offered thousands of hot meals to those in shelters. Financial assistance was planned to be provided to 100,000 people for up to 2 months, and food assistance to 40,000 for 3 months.

Mozambique 
UNICEF provided water purification supplies, medical items, tents, and hygiene kits among other things to help families and children. By 13 March, 5,000 were living in the accommodation and over 100,000 needed humanitarian assistance. The government was not prepared for a storm of Freddy's magnitude, and struggled to provide an effective response. Amnesty International suggested that Mozambique be compensated for impacts by Freddy, due to being least responsible for climate change. The Mozambican president, Filipe Nyusi, appealed for aid and to rebuild infrastructure. He also provided MT250 million ($3.9 million) to Zambezia province to help restore everyday activities. The UN Humanitarian Coordinator for the nation, Martin Griffiths, released $10 million on 16 March to support Cholera and emergency response aid.

Malawi 
By 18 March the Government of Malawi established 505 camps to house 345,183 displaced persons. Humanitarian partners worked closely with the government despite the harsh conditions brought by Freddy. Relief items placed before the storm were used to support families. Rescue teams were sent in Chilobwe, Machinjiri and Ndirande residential areas in Blantyre. Malawian citizens pooled resources to help displaced victims in Blantyre residential areas. Amnesty International suggested that Malawi be compensated for impacts by Freddy, due to being least responsible for climate change as well. 

Government-led search-and-rescue operations consisting of the Red Cross, local military, and police also commenced following the storm. On 16 March alone, 442 people were rescued. Sniffer dogs were also utilized for such operations, as many people were trapped under rubble and mud. Several areas were still rendered inaccessible days after Freddy dissipated. Millions of children were at risk of an increase in cholera cases as well. Due to cholera being transmitted through contaminated water and food, Freddy's flooding rose worries of the disease spreading greatly. Chakwera also invited the country's former presidents to a caucus to discuss methods and strategies to respond to the cyclone. 

The Everlasting Life Missionary Church donated assorted clothes to survivors in Zomba. They also fed children at camps, some of whom had not eaten at all since Freddy. They also sent out basic supplies such as body lotion, soap, and others. The crisis that ensued after Freddy also presented several negative mental health consequences among locals and frontline aid workers. Various protection services were interrupted (including childcare centers), and gender-based violence was highlighted as a prominent issue. Those affected also trafficked women, adolescent girls, and other children. Families were separated, leaving youth unattended and alone.   

EGENCO resumed operations at the Nkula and Tedzani power stations on 14 March as water along the Shire River returned to safer levels. Lazarus Chakwera declared a national two weeks of mourning for the victims of Freddy. The government promised $1.5 million for aid to those affected. The president surveyed the damage, calling it "far worse than the images and footage we've seen". The OCHA brought vital emergency supplies to the hardest-hit regions. These included medical items, hygiene kits, and even support boats from the World Food Programme for those trapped in floodwaters and rubble. In Nsanje, 24 camps were set up to accommodate 4,502 households, with Chikwawa having 21 camps for 8,837 homes. The WFP also concluded it would need over $27 million for three months to provide aid to 500,000 citizens. Humanitarian organization Christian Blind Mission (CBM) donated €100,000 ($107,245) to help emergency relief.

International response

 : Announced it would provide material for emergency shelter through the Catholic Relief Services. 

 : €200,000 ($213,810) was provided by the EU to help support victims of the system. The EU later allocated an additional €1.3 million to Mozambique, €700,000 to Malawi, and €500,000 to Madagascar. They also released $5.5 million to Malawi from the Central Emergency Response Fund (CERF) on 19 March.
 : Provided several relief items, as well as 100 metric tons of maize to Malawi. Also sent two aircraft for relief aid.
 : Provided a search-and-rescue team of 27 people (and 6 from an EMT group) on 17 March to Malawi. They also provided emergency shelter to 3,600 citizens, and safe drinking water to 12,750 as well. They also gave the country specialist boats.
 : Despite also bearing the brunt of Freddy, they provided an aircraft for emergency aid to Malawi.
 : Sent a shipment of 1,000 metric tons of flour, 6,000 blankets, 50 tents, and two helicopters for rescue operations to Malawi. Two rescue planes were also sent to Mozambique. President Samia Suluhu Hassan sent a message of condolence to the President of the Republic of Malawi Lazarus Chakwera.
 : Provided an aircraft for search-and-rescue in Malawi. Cyril Ramaphosa, president of South Africa sent condolences to the people and governments of Malawi and Mozambique.
 : Utilized IsraAid to provide hygeine, water, and sanitation needs, and also create cholera protection points with safe drinking water.

Pope Francis expressed his solidarity and condolences to the victims of the cyclone. Condolences to Malawi, Mozambique, and Madagascar were expressed by most countries, as well as Cuba, India.

Records
Freddy holds the record as the longest-lasting tropical cyclone worldwide, beating the previous record of Hurricane John in 1994. Freddy also holds the record for the all-time highest accumulated cyclone energy of a tropical cyclone worldwide, with an ACE of 87.01, breaking the former record of 85.26 which was set by Hurricane Ioke in 2006. Freddy was the first tropical cyclone to undergo seven separate rounds of rapid intensification. Freddy was one of only four systems to traverse the entirety of the southern Indian Ocean from east to west; the others were cyclones Litanne in 1994 as well as Leon–Eline and Hudah in 2000.

See also

 Tropical cyclones in 2023
 Weather of 2023
 List of Category 4 Australian region severe tropical cyclones
 List of South-West Indian Ocean very intense tropical cyclones
 Tropical cyclones in the Mascarene Islands
 List of tropical cyclone records
Other tropical cyclones similar to Freddy
 Cyclone Litanne (1994) – a long-lived cyclone in the Southern Hemisphere which impacted Madagascar.
 Hurricane John (1994) – the furthest-traveling and second longest-lived tropical cyclone ever recorded.
 Cyclone Bonita (1996) – another long-lasting tropical cyclone which also struck Madagascar and Mozambique, also making landfall near Quelimane.
 Cyclone Leon–Eline (2000) – the second longest-lived cyclone in the Southern Hemisphere which severely impacted Madagascar and Mozambique.
 Cyclone Hudah (2000) – another long-lived cyclone that also affected Madagascar.
Related tropical cyclones
 Hurricane Ioke (2006) – a powerful tropical cyclone which previously had the highest accumulated cyclone energy (ACE) worldwide before Freddy.
 Cyclone Idai (2019) – a devastating tropical cyclone which also had an erratic track within the Mozambique Channel similar to Freddy.
 Cyclone Batsirai (2022) – a powerful tropical cyclone that caused catastrophic damage in Madagascar.
 Cyclone Darian (2022) – another strong and long-lasting tropical cyclone that reached VITC status in the same season.
 Cyclone Cheneso (2023) – a strong tropical cyclone that affected Madagascar a month prior.

Notes

References

External links

MFR Track Data of Very Intense Tropical Cyclone Freddy 
JTWC Operational Track Data of Tropical Cyclone 11S (Freddy)
11S.FREDDY from the United States Naval Research Laboratory

Cyclone Freddy
2023 meteorology
2022–23 Australian region cyclone season
2022–23 South-West Indian Ocean cyclone season
2023 in Madagascar
2023 in Mozambique
2020s in Mauritius
2020s in Réunion
2020s in Zimbabwe
Tropical cyclones in 2023
Very intense tropical cyclones
Category 4 Australian region cyclones
Cyclones in Mauritius
Cyclones in Réunion
Cyclones in Madagascar
Cyclones in Mozambique
Cyclones in Zimbabwe
Cyclones in Malawi
Tropical cyclones in the Mascarene Islands
Maritime incidents in 2023
Natural disasters in Madagascar
February 2023 events in Africa
March 2023 events in Africa
2023 disasters in Africa